Cesair is a Dutch band formed in 2008 who make pagan folk, world fusion and world music. They are the main representatives of the pagan folk music scene in the Netherlands, alongside pagan folk band Omnia. The band refer to their genre as "Epic Folk & Mythic Music". They perform on a variety of modern and traditional instruments, including accordion, hurdy-gurdy, hammered dulcimer, Irish bouzouki, violin, cello, bodhrán and many others. Their songs are performed in a variety of languages ranging from Arabic, medieval Celtic languages, English, Latin, Greek, to Middle Dutch, Old Norse and more.

History 
The band was founded in 2008 in Utrecht. In 2011, they were joined by drummer Jan de Vries. In the years following, the band have performed at numerous notable alternative, gothic and medieval music festivals in Europe, including Festival-Mediaval, Wave-Gotik-Treffen, Mittelalterlich Phantasie Spectaculum and Trolls et Légendes, and have headlined at Castlefest, the largest pagan/fantasy festival in Europe, for several years. In 2016, the band announced that founding member Fieke van den Hurk would leave the band, which she did in early 2017. End of March 2017, the band announced that Luka Aubri, formerly a member of Omnia, and Faber Horbach would join the band.

Members 
Monique van Deursen – vocals, bodhrán, frame drum, zills
Sophie Zaaijer – vocals, violin, viola, cello, jew's harp
Thomas Biesmeijer – vocals, Irish bouzouki, guitars, frame drum
Luka Aubri – vocals, slideridoo 
Daan van Loon – vocals, piano, accordion

Former members 
Fieke van den Hurk – accordion, hammered dulcimer, hurdy-gurdy 
Faber Horbach – vocals, nyckelharpa, piano 
Jan de Vries – drums and other percussion instruments

Style

Music 
Cesair's music is described as "Pagan Folk", as well as "a mixture of folk and ethnic music from the Orient". The band have expressed having some difficulty with the term pagan folk, explaining that "the term 'pagan' implies that the music has a certain spiritual concept, or is aimed against certain religions, which is not what they stand for". Instead, they use the moniker "Epic Folk & Mythic Music".

Cesair's debut album, entitled Dies, Nox et Omnia, was recorded in the Wisseloord Studios in Hilversum and features a guest appearance by Sonja Drakulich from Stellamara / FAUN. In May 2015, a special edition of the band's debut album was released through Miroque GmbH / Alive AG / Screaming Banshee Records, entitled Dies, Nox et Omnia: Sine Fine. This edition was remastered by Grammy Award winner Darcy Proper in the Wisseloord Studios and features remixes by the bands Corvus Corax and Schwarzblut and by Niel Mitra from FAUN.

Lyrics 
The band's lyrics are written and sung in various languages, including Arabic, medieval Celtic languages, Spanish, Romance, Swedish, Occitan, Old English, Latin, Greek, to Middle Dutch, Old Norse and more. Besides using original lyrics the band adopts historical, classical and medieval texts such as the Enûma Eliš (Enuma Elish), the Carmina Burana (Dies, Nox et Omnia) and works from Gaston Fébus (Canso), Sappho (Graeica), Aneirin (Y Gododdin) and modern authors such as William Butler Yeats (The Wanderings of Oisín).

Meaning of the name 
The name Cesair derives from Cessair, a character from the Lebor Gabála Érenn, a medieval Christian pseudo-history of Ireland. According to the band, "the adventures of this heroic woman are in many ways interwoven into their songs, and offer numerous possibilities for exploration, since Cesair herself allegedly explored the entire known world".

Discography

Studio albums

Band members Sophie Zaaijer and Fieke van den Hurk appear as guest musicians on the Leaves' Eyes' album King of Kings

Singles

References

External links

Musical groups established in 2008
World music groups
Folk rock groups
Musical groups from Utrecht (city)
2008 establishments in the Netherlands
Dutch folk music groups